On Tha Cool is the second studio album by the American rapper Baby Beesh, released on June 11, 2002, on Dope House Records. It was produced by Happy P, Big Ice & Oral Bee from Da Playboy Foundation and Johnny Z. The album has guest performances by SPM, Jay Tee, Russell Lee, Don Cisco, Mr. Shadow and DJ Kane.

The songs "Vamanos" and "They Don't Even Know" also appeared on the album Velvetism.

Track listing

External links 
 On Tha Cool at MusicBrainz
 On Tha Cool at Tower Records

2002 albums
Baby Bash albums
West Coast hip hop albums